Almenrausch und Pulverschnee (German: Almenrausch and Powder Snow) was a German home television series which aired on RTL from 26 March 1993 to 21 May 1993.

See also
List of German television series

External links
 

1993 German television series debuts
1993 German television series endings
RTL (German TV channel) original programming
Television shows set in Austria
German-language television shows